Sphaerodiscus may refer to:
 Sphaerodiscus, a genus of echinoderms in the family Goniasteridae, synonym of Sphaeriodiscus
 Sphaerodiscus, a genus of plants in the family Celastraceae, synonym of Euonymus